is a Japanese track and field sprinter who specialises in the 200 metres. He represented his country at two consecutive World Championships, in 2011 and 2013.

His mother Sumiko Kobayashi (née Kaibara) is a gold medalist in the 200 metres and 4 × 100 metres relay at the 1979 Asian Championships in Tokyo. She was also the former Japanese record holder in the 200 metres with a time of 24.27 seconds.

Personal bests

International competition

National titles

References

External links

Yuichi Kobayashi at JAAF 

1989 births
Living people
Japanese male sprinters
Athletes from Tokyo
World Athletics Championships athletes for Japan
Hosei University alumni
21st-century Japanese people